The Unbeatables II (双天至尊II) is the sequel to the highly successful drama series The Unbeatables I.

Cast

Li Nanxing as Yan Fei
Zoe Tay as Luo Qifang/Long Jiajia/Huang Yuefang
Chew Chor Meng as Ding Zhaohui
Zhu Houren as Long Tingguang
Chen Shucheng as Yan Kun
He Weiming as Yan Xing
Liu Qianyi as Huang Wu
Kenneth Tsang as Ye Zhong
Zio Zio Lim as Huang Jia-er
Cassandra See as Luo Wenxin
Yu Rongguang as Zhuang Weicheng
Kenneth Tsang as Ye Zhong

Synopsis

Set 4 years after the end of The Unbeatables I.

In Las Vegas, a senior of Long Tingguang, Ye Zhong, undertakes a gambling competition with four other legendary gambling from around the world. After the game was won by him, the media present at the event claimed and labelled him the "King of Gamblers". However, he refuses to accept the title, and instead introduced 4 different significant people on the screens: 
 King of Deception, Long Tingguang - turned insane after he lost a gambling match to Yan Fei four years ago.
 Queen of Gamblers, Luo Qifang - rumored to be dead.
 King of Gamblers, Yan Kun - disappeared after his son won the match against Long Tingguang.
 New Generation King of Gamblers, Yan Fei - still active and his gambling skills has improved.

Ye Zhong declared that only when he beats Yan Fei on the gambling table will he be fit to be the "King of Gamblers".

Although Wenxin kept telling him that Luo Qifang is dead, Yan Fei insisted otherwise. Over 4 years, he travelled the world with his and Qifang's son, Yan Xing, hoping to find Qifang. When Yan Fei and Yan Xing got back to Coral Island, Wenxin refused to meet both father and son. As the pair stood in the rain waiting, Wenxin had series of flashbacks.

 4 years ago, Qifang took a bullet in the head for Yan Fei. Before she went for surgery, she wanted Wenxin to promise her 2 things: let Yan Fei have the custody of their son, and if the surgery is successful, she doesn't want anything to do with Yan Fei anymore. After the surgery, Qifang lost her memory and forgotten her past with Yan Fei. Wenxin decided to fulfill her promise by faking Qifang's death, sending her to Switzerland, and giving her a new name - Huang Yuefang, and a new father - Huang Wu.

Production
Location shots include San Francisco and Las Vegas in the US.

Nominations

References

External links
The Unbeatables II (English) on Mediacorp website

Singapore Chinese dramas
1996 Singaporean television series debuts
1996 Singaporean television series endings
1990s Singaporean television series
1996 Singaporean television seasons
Channel 8 (Singapore) original programming